The  superyacht Yasmine of the Sea (built as Stargate) was launched at the Oceanco yard in Alblasserdam. Monaco-based, The A Group designed the exterior of Stargate, with interior design by Camillo Costantini & The A Group. She has two sister ships, the 1999 built  Constellation and the 2000 built  Indian Empress.

Design 
The hull is built out of steel while the superstructure is made out of aluminium with teak laid decks. The yacht is Lloyd's registered, issued by Bahamas.

Engines 
She is powered by twin 8160.0 hp MTU 20V 1163 TB73L diesel engines.

See also
 List of motor yachts by length
 List of yachts built by Oceanco
 Luxury yacht
 Oceanco

References

2001 ships
Motor yachts
Ships built in the Netherlands